Casas Adobes is an unincorporated community and census-designated place (CDP) in Grant County, New Mexico, United States. It was first listed as a CDP prior to the 2020 census. Previously it was included within the San Lorenzo CDP.

The community is in eastern Grant County, in the valley of the Mimbres River. It is bordered to the northeast by San Lorenzo and to the north by Mimbres, both unincorporated. New Mexico State Road 152 passes just south of the community, leading west  to Santa Clara and east over the Black Range  to Hillsboro.

Demographics

References 

Census-designated places in Grant County, New Mexico
Census-designated places in New Mexico